The Isrotel Tower is a hotel located on the beachfront of Tel Aviv, Israel.

The tower is 108 meters high, has 29 floors and is operated by the Israeli Isrotel hotel group. A Gvirtzman Architects designed the towers which were completed in 1966, whilst the main core was completed in the 1980s. The diameter of the structure is 29 meters and the tower is constructed on the site of the Gan Rina Theatre. The hotel consists of 90 suites whilst the top floors house 62 apartments. The tower is constructed on a narrow pedestal.

The Nakash family purchased the tower for $150 million USD in April 2013.

See also
List of skyscrapers in Israel
Architecture of Israel
Tourism in Israel

References

External links
Isrotel Tower Tel Aviv
Isrotel Tower at Emporis
Isrotel Tower

Skyscrapers in Tel Aviv
Hotels in Tel Aviv
Residential buildings completed in 1997
Postmodern architecture
Hotels established in 1997
Skyscraper hotels
Residential skyscrapers in Israel
Skyscrapers in Israel